Thomas Edward Barnsley OBE FCA (1 September 1919 – 31 August 1992) was a British businessman.  He was managing director, Tube Investments 1974–1982 and director, H.P. Bulmer Holdings, 1980–1987.  He was the son of Alfred E. Barnsley and Ada F. Nightingale. He married Margaret Gwyneth Llewellin, they had one son and a daughter, Victoria Barnsley.  He was awarded OBE in 1975.  During the Second World War he was a member of the Friends' Ambulance Unit.

References

1919 births
1992 deaths
20th-century British businesspeople
Officers of the Order of the British Empire